Creative technology may  refer to:
 Creative technology
 Creative Technology Limited, the computer hardware manufacturer.
 Citroën's advertising slogan.